2-(Dicyanomethylene)croconate is a divalent anion with chemical formula  or ((N≡C−)2C=)(C5O4)2−.  It is one of the pseudo-oxocarbon anions, as it can be described as a derivative of the croconate oxocarbon anion  through the replacement of one oxygen atom by a dicyanomethylene group =C(−C≡N)2.

The anion was synthesized and characterized by A. Fatiadi in 1980, by hydrolysis of croconate violet treated with potassium hydroxide. It gives an orange solution in water.

See also
 Croconate violet, 1,3-bis(dicyanomethylene)croconate
 Croconate blue, 1,2,3-tris(dicyanomethylene)croconate
 1,2-Bis(dicyanomethylene)squarate
 1,3-Bis(dicyanomethylene)squarate

References

Oxyanions
Cyclopentenes